"Twenty-One Guns" is the 267th episode of the American television series, ER. The episode aired on May 18, 2006 on NBC.

Plot

It's the day of Michael's funeral. It is a private ceremony and Pratt is the only non-family member invited. He stops off in the ER in the morning and all the staff give their love for him to pass on to Neela. As he leaves Ray follows him outside. He wants to go to the funeral as well. Pratt gently tells him to back off. When Ray doesn't take the hint Pratt intimates that Neela isn't ready to get involved with anyone else at the moment. Ray doesn't confirm or deny his feelings but looks guilty at the suggestion. A black limousine pulls up and a soldier opens the door. Pratt asks where Neela is and the soldier tells him that she's not coming.

Kerry is called up to a meeting with Anspaugh to discuss the situation with Clemente. She's surprised to find that their words are being recorded. Anspaugh wants to know why Kerry hired Clemente in the first place after his troubled history and she defends her actions. Anspaugh says the hospital is facing a malpractice suit by a patient that could be very costly. Kerry notes that Luka was in charge of the ER when everything started going wrong and Anspaugh notes that people aren't very happy with Luka's work either. He asks Kerry if she is happy with it and she reluctantly supports him saying "he's done the best with the resources he's had".

At Luka's apartment Abby wakes up to the sound of Croatian muttering in another room. She follows the sound and finds Luka assembling a crib for the baby. Amused she tries to articulate her feelings for Luka. He takes this as a sign that she is ready for commitment and suggests that they get married.

Later in a trauma Luka is giving Abby frosty looks. She calls him on this and he admits he's annoyed because she didn't give him the answer he was hoping for. He asks if they love each other and she admits that they do but she doesn't want to rush into anything like she did with her first marriage. Their discussion is put on hold by a patient needing Abby and Kerry wanting to talk to Luka.

Kerry tells Luka about her meeting with Anspaugh. Luka notes that he wasn't chief when Clemente was hired and asks if he's getting blamed for not firing him sooner. Kerry is vague but from this non-answer Luka can see that his job might be in jeopardy.

Meanwhile, it's Morris' last day in the ER before he leaves to work for a drug company and he's refusing to treat half of the patients that come in as he thinks he deserves special treatment. He also is trying to keep a video diary to remind him of his time at County and is shoving a camera into people's faces and getting them to say complimentary things about him. Once the staff tire of this he starts in on the patients – prompting them what to say. One of the patients Morris rejects is a little boy called Timmy who is dressed as a strawberry. Jerry tries to comfort the boy while he waits for another doctor.

Pratt gets to Neela's apartment and begs her to go to the funeral. She admits that she's not ready to say goodbye to him yet but eventually consents to come. In the limo the soldier goes over the program of events including the full military honors that Michael will be given. Neela isn't keen but Pratt gently says that Michael would have probably liked it.

Sam is given the task of showing EMT trainee Mary around the ER and letting her perform minor procedures such as taking a BP. She quickly becomes irritated by Mary's lack of knowledge as do the other staff, especially when she claims to know CPR and then performs it incorrectly. Luka throws her out of the exam room then later sympathizes with Sam over her predicament which only gets worse when Steve and another prisoner are brought into the ER for injuries sustained while fighting. Morris again opts out on the patients, instead turfing them to Ray.

The second prisoner is called Rafe and is suffering from head injuries. Steve has ripped stitches from his appendectomy (see episode No Place To Hide). Rafe blames Steve for the fight. The two prisoners are accompanied by correctional officers. When Sam hears about Steve being in she goes to see. She speaks with Rafe who talks Steve down. Mary's skills seem to be improving though as she takes a correct BP. Sam gathers her courage and finally goes to see Steve. She starts to treat his wound, not noticing Mary in the other room knocking out the officer looking after Rafe with a chloroform-soaked rag. While Sam chats with Steve, Mary unlocks Rafe and the prisoner dresses up in the officer's clothes.

At the funeral Neela and the other mourners flinch at the twenty-one gun salute. Neela remembers the good and bad times with Michael (see episodes The Student, Where There's Smoke, Two Ships and Split Decisions). Afterwards at the wake Michael's father starts talking about the 'mind of a warrior' being constantly prepared for death. Neela gives him Michael's medals and when he tries to give them back to her she rounds on him and accuses him of persuading Michael to go back to Iraq for no good reason. She says that his father should have made him stay simply because he loved him, not sent him away for a false sense of duty.

Sam is treating Steve in the suture room when Mary walks and points a gun at the other guard. Rafe follows her, also with a gun. Sam asks what they're doing as they knock out the other officer and unlock Steve. They are escaping. Steve says that his newfound religious faith convinced him that everything would be right in his life if he got his family back.

Abby treats an elderly man while two elderly lady friends watch. They say he disappeared from the nursing home but they found him through the power of prayer. They say they'd like to get out of the ER as soon as possible as they sense something bad is coming. They ask Abby if her baby is okay. She responds that it is but the question worries her. They ask Abby if she is religious and when they guess she is not they call her brave for having a child in a bad world without believing in God.

At the admit area Luka hears that Steve has been brought in to the ER and that Sam is treating him. He goes to see if she needs any help. When he gets to the suture room that Steve was being treated in he finds the door locked. He knocks and inside they freeze. He demands to be let in and Mary tells him to wait just a moment. Luka bangs on the door and they let him in. When Luka sees what's going on a struggle ensues. Mary stabs Luka in the back with a syringe full of vecuronium bromide. This causes him to collapse and stop breathing, paralysed.

Steve is now anxious for them to leave but Sam has to intubate Luka as he will not be able to breathe for another half-hour. Steve tells Mary to go outside and drive the prison van up to the exit door. Mary stops to exchange a passionate kiss with Rafe, indicating they are together. Mary then leaves the suture room but Abby approaches her, looking for the sonosite. Mary tells her she doesn't think it's in there. Abby attempts to sidestep Mary to enter the suture room but Mary stops her. Abby becomes suspicious and asks if there is something going on in there and Mary tells her they're about to do an intubation. Abby asks Mary if Kovac is performing the intubation and Mary tells her that Kovac has gone to the place they do the "head thingy." Abby walks around her and approaches the suture room, asking if "the head thingy" was to mean "CT." In a panic to distract Abby, Mary acts confused, asking "The what?" Abby turns back to face Mary, pushing open the door several inches and asks if she meant to say "CT" just as Rafe raises a gun, positioning it to be directly in her face when she turns back to enter the room. Defeated, Mary confirms she meant Kovac had gone to CT, just as Abby remembers she had last seen the sonosite in exam 3. Abby walks away and the door falls closed, leaving Abby oblivious to the gun formerly just inches away as she narrowly avoided disaster.

Sam wants to help Luka and tells them they do not want to be murderers. They let Sam do it but she is nervous and shaking and it takes her a while. Sam tubes Luka with the help of Steve and starts to squeeze in air. His eyes flutter and for the moment he is okay. For the criminals this means that it's time to go. They grab Sam and drag her away despite her protests that Luka still needs help. Mary goes to fetch the van giving Rafe a kiss to indicate they are together.

Steve and Rafe hide their guns and Steve sits in a wheelchair. Sam tells them they can stop this now but they ignore her. She wheels the chair through the ER, Rafe following behind dressed as an officer. Just before they exit Morris stops them because some police officers have arrived looking for a patient that Sam treated. Sam tries to hint at Morris that something is wrong but he doesn't get it. As they are leaving Abby, who is at the admit desk, asks Sam if everything is okay. She replies that everything is but calls Abby 'Abigail'. Abby knows that there is something wrong and tells the police officers to call them back from the waiting room. When they do Steve stands up and Rafe turns and the two of them start shooting at everything in sight. Broken glass and bullets fly everywhere. Jerry pushes the little boy Timmy to the ground. Abby is knocked over. A police officer is shot and patients and staff alike try to get away from the danger.

Rafe and Steve turn and, dragging Sam with them, exit to the ambulance bay where Mary has brought a van. They fire a few warning shots and the people in the street around them scatter. Sam begs to be let go, telling Steve to think of their son Alex. He already has. He opens up the van to reveal Alex tied up in the back. Sam jumps in and the criminals follow her, screeching away.

In the ER the staff get to action organizing the wounded. Abby has a cut on her head but otherwise appears fine. The police officer who was shot needs treatment. Jerry is still lying on the floor. The staff roll him over to find that he's been shot through the chest. They take him to the trauma rooms and start working on him.

Neela sits at Michael's graveside again. Pratt gets a call from the ER but he ignores it. Neela asks if this is something that she will never get over. Pratt tells her that she will get over it and manage to lead a good life. Pratt gets another call from the ER.

Sam and Alex sit in the back of the van as they speed down the highway. Rafe and Steve are panicking now as the police chase them. Sam notes that they probably killed some of her friends and tries to get them to stop but they ignore her and drive on.

In the suture room Luka is handcuffed to a gurney. He tries to rock it and get it to move but doesn't have much success. In the trauma room Morris, Ray and Abby work hard on Jerry, whose condition is slowly deteriorating. Abby starts to feel dizzy but puts this down to the bump on the head she received. Kerry arrives, angry that no one called her sooner, and starts to get to work. Abby goes searching in the empty trauma room for a piece of equipment and again starts to feel dizzy. Luka sees her through the window and again starts to rock the gurney to try to get her attention. Abby doubles over with pain. She draws a hand out from between her legs and it is covered in blood. She sways again then collapses on the floor, unconscious. Luka seeing this, starts to fight hard against the cuffs but there is nothing he can do. Abby lies alone on the floor of the empty trauma room.

Guest starring
"Staff -"
John Aylward as Dr. Donald Anspaugh
Abraham Benrubi as Desk Clerk Jerry Markovic
Laura Cerón as Nurse Chuny Marquez
Yvette Freeman as Nurse Haleh Adams
Montae Russell as Paramedic Dwight Zadro
Lynn A. Henderson as Paramedic Pamela Olbes
Brian Lester as Paramedic Brian Dumar

"Others -"
Garret Dillahunt as Steve Curtis
Dominic Janes as Alex Taggart
Natasha Gregson Wagner as Mary Warner
Michael Weston as Rafe Hendricks
Ernie Hudson as Colonel James Gallant
Sheryl Lee Ralph as Gloria Gallant
Tim Griffin as Captain John Evans
Skyler Gisondo as Timmy Jankowski
Louis Iacoviello as Officer Rovner
Christian Svensson as Sheriff Pohler
Paul Webster as Sheriff Radford
Phyllis Applegate as Older Lady #1
Connie Sawyer as Older Lady #2
Dane Farwell as Hospital Police Officer

References

External links
 Full Cast & Crew at the Internet Movie Database

ER (TV series) episodes
2006 American television episodes
Television episodes about funerals